Teasdale is a surname. Notable people with the surname include:

George Teasdale (1831–1907), English Mormon apostle and missionary
Graham Teasdale (born 1955), Australian rules football player
Harvey Teasdale (1817–1904), English circus clown
John D. Teasdale, British researcher in cognition and brain therapy
Joseph P. Teasdale (1936–2014), American politician from Missouri; governor of Missouri 1977–81
Kat Teasdale (1964–2016), Canadian auto racing driver
Keith Teasdale (born 1954), English former cricketer
Lucille Teasdale-Corti (1929–1996), Canadian physician and international aid worker
Mike Teasdale (born 1969), Scottish footballer
Noel Teasdale (born 1938), Australian rules football player
Sara Teasdale (1884–1933), American poet
Verree Teasdale (1903–1987), American radio and film actress
Washington Teasdale (1830-1903), British engineer, photographer and inventor
Wayne Teasdale (1945–2004), American Roman Catholic monk, teacher, and activist
William B. Teasdale (1856–1907), American lawyer, judge and politician